The Chile Billie Jean King Cup team represents Chile in the Billie Jean King Cup tennis competition and are governed by the Chile Tennis Federation.  They currently compete in the Americas Zone Group II.

History
Chile competed in its first Fed Cup in 1968. Their best result was reaching the round of 16 in 1978.

Current team (2019)
 Daniela Seguel
 Fernanda Brito
 Bárbara Gatica
 Alexa Guarachi

External links

Billie Jean King Cup teams
Fed Cup
Fed Cup